Mount Verne is a mountain (1,632 m) standing 6 nautical miles (11 km) east of Bongrain Point and dominating the south part of Pourquoi Pas Island, off the west coast of Graham Land. It was first sighted and roughly surveyed in 1909 by the French Antarctic Expedition under Charcot, and then resurveyed in 1948 by the Falkland Islands Dependencies Survey (FIDS). It was named by them for Jules Verne, the author of Twenty Thousand Leagues Under the Sea. Other features on Pourquoi Pas Island are named after characters in this book.

See also
 List of Ultras of Antarctica

References

Sources

Mountains of Graham Land
Fallières Coast